Larry Harrison (born February 28, 1955) is an American basketball coach who parted ways after 15 1/2 years 01/12/2023 as associate head coach to Bob Huggins at West Virginia University. Harrison was formerly the head men's basketball coach at the University of Hartford. He resigned at the end of the 2006, after a season in which he was named America East Conference Coach of the Year. He had been with the Mountaineers since 2007.

Head coaching record

References

External links
 WVU Profile

1955 births
Living people
American Eagles men's basketball coaches
American men's basketball coaches
American men's basketball players
Basketball coaches from North Carolina
Basketball players from North Carolina
Cincinnati Bearcats men's basketball coaches
DePaul Blue Demons men's basketball coaches
Hartford Hawks men's basketball coaches
High school basketball coaches in the United States
Sportspeople from Greenville, North Carolina
Pittsburgh Panthers men's basketball players
Point guards